This is a list of museums in Jordan.

Museums in Jordan

Central Region 

The Jordan Museum 
The Duke's Diwan
Royal Tank Museum
The Children's Museum Jordan
Hedjaz Jordan Railway Museum
Jordan Archaeological Museum
Jordan National Gallery of Fine Arts
 Museum of Textbooks, Al-Salt
Prophet Mohammad Museum
The Dead Sea Museum

South Region 
Aqaba Archaeological Museum
Museum at the Lowest Place on Earth

See also 

 List of museums

References

External links 	
 Visit Jordan - Museums in Jordan

Museums
 
Museums
Jordan
Museums
Jordan